"911 Song" was released on September 11, 2002, the one-year anniversary of the terrorist attacks on the United States, by the Japanese hip-hop group King Giddra. King Giddra released this single as part of their album Saishuu Heiki/The Final Weapon. The song delivers potent, politically charged lyrics that challenge the United States government and their role in the terrorist attacks of 9/11.

Lyrics
The song uses a repetitive chanting of the phrase "Remember that day, that day, that day" as its chorus in memory of September 11, and the attacks that clearly resonated across the world. Both MCs in the group, K Dub Shine and Zebra, deliver verses that urge the world to question not "what, where, who, but why" the attacks happen. K Dub Shine ends his verse with a critique of the Bush administration, saying "It's always civilians who are sacrificed, even so, Bush sleeps in his bed tonight." The lyrics as well as a music video can be found at http://web.mit.edu/condry/www/jhh/mov/KG-911-small.mov.

Cultural analysis of "911 Song"
While it may seem interesting that one of the main Japanese hip-hop groups has released a single about a terrorist attack in the United States, this attention to the United States, especially New York, should come as no surprise. Japanese hip hop draws incredible homage to the United States for its rap culture and its African-American culture. Youth in Japan have even been known to darken their faces, in a style known as burapan, to mimic the look and style of blacks in America. However, as the lyrics of the song show, Japanese hip hop heads are not simply going for the look of black youth, they have a message, and often a politically charged message, that falls into lockstep, (or rhythm) with black youth. King Giddra was not the only hip hop group to criticize the American government for the terrorist attacks: Wyclef Jean, the Gorillaz, and countless other groups have released songs in the wake of 911.

References 

2002 singles
Music about the September 11 attacks